Abraham Lincoln High School was a public high school in western Port Arthur, Texas and a part of the Port Arthur Independent School District. Prior to 1965 schools were segregated by race and black students attended Lincoln. White students did not choose to attend the school in significant numbers after desegregation even though the district had initial plans for a more racially balanced student body.

It was established in 1904.

In 2002 it merged into Memorial High School. The building was converted into a middle school.

References

External links
 
 The Bumblebee, Yearbook of Lincoln High School, 1963 - From Port Arthur Public Library, hosted at the University of North Texas

2002 disestablishments in Texas
Educational institutions disestablished in 2002
Public high schools in Texas
High schools in Jefferson County, Texas